"Microphone Master" is a song by American hip hop group Das EFX. It is the second single from their third studio album Hold It Down (1995). The song was produced by Easy Mo Bee.

The official remix of the song features hip hop group Mobb Deep and was also released in 1995.

Charts

References

1995 songs
1996 singles
Das EFX songs
East West Records singles
Song recordings produced by Easy Mo Bee
Songs written by Easy Mo Bee